= Devaki Raj =

- Citizenship: USA
- Education: Oxford University, Oxford, UK M.Sc., Applied Statistics, Keble College B.A. (Hons) Biological Sciences, Balliol College

Devaki Raj, who grew up in Lexington, Massachusetts, is chief digital and AI officer in the strategy office at Saab, Inc. and CEO and co-founder of CrowdAI.

== Career ==
Devaki Raj completed her undergraduate and graduate studies at the University of Oxford in Biological Sciences and Statistics. Subsequently, she worked at Google on a variety of projects, including Maps, Energy, and [X]. She co-founded CrowdAI in 2016 and was awarded VentureBeat's 2022 Women in AI AI Entrepreneur Award, named one of Inc and Forbes' Magazines’ 30 under 30, and participated in The White House Humanitarian Assistance and Disaster Response Executive Forum. Under her leadership, CrowdAI was named one of America's Most Promising Artificial Intelligence Companies by Forbes’ 2021 AI 50 list, was a CVPR Deep Globe Competition finalist and an NVIDIA Deep Learning Inception Awards finalist, and participated in the NeurIPS AI for Social Good Workshop.

CrowdAI rose to prominence in the AI community by developing a leading end-to-end, “no-code”, computer vision platform. The software prioritized mass user accessibility, enabling enterprises to take their existing image and video data and to build production-ready computer vision models on their own. Previous customers included Fortune 500 companies as well as flagship AI programs at the Department of Defense's Joint Artificial Intelligence Center (JAIC), the U.S. Air Force, the U.S. Navy, the National Geospatial-Intelligence Agency, and U.S. Southern Command. CrowdAI solutions have supported a variety of missions, including mapping wildfires for first responders in California, assessing post-hurricane damage in South America, as well as improving manufacturing quality, to name a few.

For the last seven years, Devaki Raj has served as the CEO and co-founder of CrowdAI, a Silicon Valley–based leader in artificial intelligence and computer vision. CrowdAI was acquired recently by Saab Inc., where she is now the Chief Digital and AI Officer (CDAO) in the Strategy Office.

She is currently serving on The National Geospatial Advisory Committee (NGAC), a Federal Advisory Committee sponsored by the Department of the Interior and on the board of The Alliance for Commercial Technology in Government. On September 14, 2023, Devaki testified before the U.S. Senate on AI procurement.

On December 5, she was invited to Senator Majority Leader Chuck Schumer's AI Executive Forum.

== Awards and honors ==
- Senator Chuck Schumer's bipartisan Executive AI Insight Forum (2023)
- Full Committee Senate Testimony to the U.S.Senate Committee on Homeland Security & Governmental Affairs (2023)
- Rebellion Research's Top 10 Women in the World of AI (2023)
- Eric Schmidt's International Strategy Forum North American Fellow (2023)
- Marie Claire's First Annual Power List (2022)
- The Women Disrupting Disruptive Industries, Forbes’ Magazine (2022)
- Venture Beat's Women in AI and AI Innovation Awards winner (2022)
- Forbes 30 under 30 Science, featured honoree (2019)
- Henry David Thoreau Scholar (2007–2010)

== Community service ==
- The Alliance for Commercial Technology in Government, Washington, D.C., Board Member (2022–2023)
- Community Technology Network, San Francisco, California, Board Member (2015–2018)
- Julia Robinson Math Festival, Mountain View, California, Chair (2014)
- JUMPSTART, San Francisco, California., Jnr. Board Member (2012–2014)
- PSI Asia-Pacific Summer Institute, Statistics Instructor (2013)
- Oxford University Volunteer Society (OXHub), Steering Committee Member (2008–2009)
